The  is a railway line of Japanese private railway company Keisei Electric Railway connecting Tokyo and Narita, Japan. It is the main line of Keisei's railway network.
Built as an interurban between Tokyo and Narita in the early 20th century, the line has been serving as a main access route to Narita International Airport since 1978. It also serves major cities along the line such as Funabashi, Narashino, and Sakura.

In 2010, the Narita Sky Access opened as a bypass of the line, reducing the role of the main line in the airport access.

Service patterns
 S = Skyliner
Between Keisei Takasago and Narita Airport Terminal 1, it runs on the Narita Sky Access Line. Runs the entire length of the route in 44 minutes (36 minutes from Nippori to Narita Airport Terminal 2·3).

 Cityliner (unscheduled)
Trains call at Nippori, Aoto, Keisei Funabashi, and Keisei Narita.

  M = Morningliner
Runs only in the morning from Narita Airport Terminal 1 and Keisei Narita to Keisei Ueno.

  E = Eveningliner
Runs only in the evening from Keisei Ueno to Keisei Narita and Narita Airport Terminal 1.

  L = 
Non-charged. Runs from Keisei Ueno or Oshiage Line to Narita Airport Terminal 1. Runs during morning and evening times only. Runs from Keisei Ueno or Oshiage Line to Hokusō, Narita Airport Terminal 1 or Shibayama Chiyoda.

  A = 
Non-charged. Runs from Keisei Ueno or Oshiage Line to Narita Airport Terminal 1, via the Narita Sky Access Line between Keisei Takasago and Narita Airport Terminal 1.

  L = 
Non-charged. Runs only from the late morning to the early evening. Runs from Keisei Ueno or Oshiage Line to Hokusō, Narita Airport Terminal 1 or Shibayama Chiyoda.

  C = 
Runs from Keisei Ueno or Oshiage Line to Narita Airport Terminal 1 or Shibayama Chiyoda. Runs only in the morning and evenings.

  R = 
Runs from Keisei Ueno or Oshiage Line to Narita Airport Terminal 1 or Shibayama Chiyoda.

  
Sometimes called .

Stations
Legend
 ● : All trains stop
 │ : All trains pass
 ◇ : Some limited express trains stop when horse racing is held in Nakayama Racecourse.
 ▲ : Some Skyliner trains stop.

Notes
Local trains stop at every station.

History
All sections opened as electrified dual track unless noted otherwise. The initial section opened between Takasago and Edogawa as  gauge in 1912, and the line was progressively extended in both directions, reaching Narita in 1930 and Ueno in 1933.

In 1978, it was extended to Narita Airport (now Higashi-Narita). The single track extension to Terminal 1 was opened in 1992.

Former connecting lines
 Funabashi-Keibajō Station: A 1 km  gauge line electrified at 600 V DC opened to the Yatsu amusement park in 1927, with the voltage being raised to 1,200 V DC the following year. The line closed in 1934.

See also
 List of railway lines in Japan
 Home Liner

References
This article incorporates material from the corresponding article in the Japanese Wikipedia.

 
Main Line
Railway lines in Tokyo
Railway lines in Chiba Prefecture
Airport rail links in Japan
Standard gauge railways in Japan
Narita International Airport
Railway lines opened in 1912
1912 establishments in Japan